Foreman is a surname. Notable people with the surname include:

A–E
Al Foreman (1904–1954), English-Canadian boxer
Amanda Foreman (disambiguation), multiple people
Anne N. Foreman (born 1947), American diplomat, lawyer, and businesswoman
Aricka Foreman, American poet, essayist, and digital curator
Brownie Foreman (1875–1926), American baseball player
Carl Foreman (1914–1984), American screenwriter and film producer
Carolyn T. Foreman (1872–1967), Resident and Historian of American state of Oklahoma, wife of fellow historian Grant Foreman
Chris Foreman (born 1956), English musician, singer-songwriter, and composer
Chris Foreman (organist), American jazz organist
Chuck Foreman (born 1950), American football player
Dale Foreman, American politician and attorney
Dan Foreman (born 1953), American politician
Darren Foreman (disambiguation), multiple people
David Foreman (born 1947), American environmentalist
Deborah Foreman (born 1962), American actress
Denis Foreman (1933–2016), South African cricketer and footballer
Dominic Foreman (1933–2020), Australian politician
Donald Bruce Foreman (1945–2004), Australian botanist
D'Onta Foreman (born 1996), American football player
Earl Foreman (1924–2017), American lawyer and sports executive
Ed Foreman (1933–2022), American politician
Edward Foreman (1937–2018), American opera singer
Edward R. Foreman (1808–1885), American meteorologist
Eileen Foreman, British football player

F–J
Ferris Foreman (1808–1901), American lawyer, politician, and soldier
Frank Foreman (1863–1957), American baseball player
Freddie Foreman (born 1932), English gangster
George Foreman (disambiguation), multiple people
Gordy Foreman, drummer of the band Frenzal Rhomb
Gregg Foreman, American musician and DJ
Happy Foreman (1899–1953), American baseball player
Henry Foreman (1852–1924), British politician
Hooks Foreman (1895–1940), American baseball player
Ian Foreman (1930–2021), Australian rules footballer
Jack Foreman Mantle (1917–1940), English recipient of the Victoria Cross
James Foreman (disambiguation), multiple people
Jamie Foreman (born 1958), English actor
Jay Foreman (disambiguation), multiple people
John Foreman (disambiguation), multiple people
Jon Foreman (born 1976), American musician
Jonathan Foreman (journalist) (born 1965), British journalist
Joseph Foreman (born 1974), real name of rapper Afroman, American rapper and musician
Joseph Foreman (athlete) (1935–1999), Canadian sprinter

L–Z
Laura Foreman (1937–2001), American dancer and choreographer
Laura Foreman (journalist) (1943–2021), American journalist and editor
Lynette Foreman (born 1957), Australian hurdler
Matt Foreman (activist), American activist
Matthew Foreman (born 1957), American mathematician
Michael Foreman (disambiguation), multiple people
Milton J. Foreman (1863–1935), American general
Paul Foreman (1939–2020), Jamaican long jumper
Percy Foreman (1902–1988), American lawyer
Richard Foreman (born 1937), American playwright and avant-garde theater pioneer
Rob Foreman (born 1984), New Zealand rugby union player
Sean Foreman (born 1985), American musician
Shawn Foreman (born 1975), American football player
Tim Foreman (born 1978), American musician
Tom Foreman (born 1959), American journalist
Travel Foreman (born 1982), American comics artist
Wally Foreman (1948–2006), Australian sports administrator and commentator
Wayne Foreman (born 1955), Australian rules footballer
William Foreman (1726–1777), colonial American military officer
Yuri Foreman (born 1980), Israeli boxer

Fictional characters
Eric Foreman, a character in the television series House
Susan Foreman, a character in the television series Doctor Who

See also
Annie Foreman-Mackey (born 1991), Canadian cyclist
Justin Wright-Foreman (born 1997), American basketball player

Occupational surnames
English-language occupational surnames